ESMR may refer to:

 Electrically Scanning Microwave Radiometer
 Enhanced Specialized Mobile Radio